Events in the year 1705 in Norway.

Incumbents
Monarch: Frederick IV

Events

Arts and literature

Births

Full date unknown
Jakob Klukstad, wood carver (died 1773).

Deaths

13 March – Curt Christoph von Koppelow, nobleman and officer (born c. 1624).
28 August – Ludvig Stoud, bishop (b. 1649).
13 September – Albert Angell, civil servant, landowner and businessperson (born 1660).

Full date missing
Mats de Tonsberg, civil servant and timber trader (born 1638).

See also

References

 
Denmark
Denmark